Yasmin Schnack (born May 4, 1988) is a former professional tennis player from the United States.

Her highest singles and doubles rankings are No. 371 and No. 140, respectively, both set in the 2012 season.

In her career, Schnack won two singles titles and eleven doubles titles on the ITF Circuit. In September 2013, she played her last ITF tournament in Redding, California.

Career
2012 has turned out to be the best year yet for Schnack- she won one ITF singles title and five doubles titles, two of those being $50k events.

In that same year, Yasmin also played her first match in a major tournament at Wimbledon where she entered the doubles event with fellow American player Vania King. The pair were eliminated in the first round by Iveta Benešová and Barbora Záhlavová-Strýcová.

ITF finals

Singles: 4 (2–2)

Doubles: 17 (11–6)

References

External links
 
 

1988 births
Living people
American female tennis players
Sportspeople from Sacramento, California
UCLA Bruins women's tennis players
Tennis people from California